Unseen Power is the thirteenth studio album of the Christian rock band, Petra. It was released in November 1991.

The album retains a driving edge while veering away from the more commercial pop-metal sound of their previous efforts. Bob Hartman has stated that he and the producers intentionally chose to move in directions they were not instinctively inclined to go.

Track listing
All songs written by Bob Hartman, except where noted.
 "Destiny" – 4:31
 "Who's on the Lord's Side" (words and music by Rev. Timothy Wright) – 3:54
 "Ready, Willing and Able" – 4:14
 "Hand on My Heart" (music by John Elefante, Hartman) – 4:26
 "I Need to Hear from You" – 4:04
 "Dance" (music by Elefante) – 3:46
 "Secret Weapon" (music by Hartman, Elefante) – 4:01
 "Sight Unseen" – 3:58
 "Hey World" – 3:52
 "In the Likeness of You" (words and music by John Lawry) – 4:51

Awards
 Won Grammy Award for Best Rock Gospel Album in 1992.
 Won Dove Award for Rock Recorded Song ("Destiny") in 1993.

Personnel 
Petra
 Bob Hartman – guitars, arrangements
 John Schlitt – vocals
 John Lawry – keyboards, arrangements
 Ronny Cates – bass
 Louie Weaver – drums

Additional backing vocals
 Doug Beiden
 Ron Gollner
 Olivia McClurkin
 Alfred McCrary
 Howard McCrary
 Perry Morgan
 Tony Palacios
 Rob Rock
 Jamie Rowe
 Alfie Silas
 Rose Stone
 Sara Tennison

Production
 John Elefante – producer, arrangements, engineer at Pakaderm Studios, Los Alamitos, California, Pakaderm West, Los Alamitos, California
 Dino Elefante – producer, arrangements, engineer
 Doug Beiden – engineer, mix assistant
 J.R. McNeely – engineer, mix assistant
 Neil Kernon – mixing
 Chris Bellman – mastering at Bernie Grundman Mastering, Hollywood, California
 Lynn Keesecker – A&R direction
 Loren Balman – art direction
 Ed Goble – art direction
 Patrick Pollei – art direction, design
 Steven Fryer – design
 Michael Goldenberg – design
 Amy Linde – art production coordinator
 Jeff Katz – band and individual photos
 Neill Whitlock – cover concept photography
 Helena Occhipinti – hair
 Margaret Kimura – make-up
 Keiki Mingus – stylist

References

1991 albums
Petra (band) albums